Hermann Mayregger was an Austrian who competed during the early 1950s. He won the bronze medal in the men's singles at the 1951 European luge championships  in Igls, Austria.

References
List of European luge champions 

Austrian male lugers
Possibly living people
Year of birth missing